Berthelinia typica is a species of sea snail with a shell comprising two separate hinged pieces or valves. It is a marine gastropod mollusc in the family Juliidae. It was first described as Edentellina typica in 1911 by Gatliff and Gabriel.

Distribution
The type locality for this species is Port Phillip, Victoria, Australia. However it is found in South Australia, Tasmania, and Victoria.

References

External links 

 Images and detailed description (as Edentellina typica)

Juliidae
Gastropods described in 1911